Moti Nagar or Motinagar may refer to:
Moti Nagar (New Delhi) a neighbourhood of New Delhi.
Moti Nagar (Hyderabad) a neighbourhood of Hyderabad.